Sunkoshi Rural Municipality  in Okhaldhunga District was formed in March 2017, by merging 5 former VDCs of Katunje, Chyanam, Mulkharka, Sisneri and Balakhu. The center of this rural municipality is located at Mulkharka.

Demographics
At the time of the 2011 Nepal census, Sunkoshi Rural Municipality had a population of 18,558. Of these, 58.1% spoke Nepali, 18.9% Tamang, 10.8% Magar, 5.6% Jerung, 4.7% Rai, 1.3% Sunwar, 0.1% Maithili and 0.5% other languages as their first language.

In terms of ethnicity/caste, 26.6% were Chhetri, 19.1% Tamang, 12.7% Hill Brahmin, 11.5% Magar, 10.7% Rai, 6.3% Newar, 3.4% Kami, 2.4% Damai/Dholi, 2.1% Sunuwar and 5.2% others.

In terms of religion, 69.5% were Hindu, 19.6% Buddhist, 10.5% Kirati, 0.1% Christian and 0.3% others.

References

Rural municipalities in Koshi Province

Populated places in Okhaldhunga District
Rural municipalities of Nepal established in 2017
Rural municipalities in Okhaldhunga District